The 36th annual Venice International Film Festival was held from 24 August to 5 September 1979. There was no jury because from 1969 to 1979 the festival was not competitive.

Films premiered
 Le passe-montagne by Jean-François Stévenin (France)
 La nouba des femmes du mont Chenoua by Assia Djebar (Algeria)
 Autumn Marathon by Georgiy Daneliya (Soviet Union)
 The Strangling by Kaneto Shindô (Japan)
 Saint Jack by Peter Bogdanovich (France)

Awards
FIPRESCI Prize
Le passe-montagne (Jean-François Stévenin)
La nouba des femmes du mont Chenoua (Assia Djebar)
Honorable Mention: Le vieil Anaï (Jean Rouch)
Pasinetti Award
Best Film: Autumn Marathon (Georgiy Daneliya) and Saint Jack (Peter Bogdanovich)
Best Actor: Yevgeny Leonov (Autumn Marathon)
Best Actress: Nobuko Otowa (The Strangling)
Pietro Bianchi Award
Cesare Zavattini

References

External links
 
 Venice Film Festival 1979 Awards on IMDb

Venice International Film Festival
Venice International Film Festival
Venice Film Festival
Film
Venice International Film Festival
Venice International Film Festival